Indian Telly Award for Best Actor in a Comic eseeeds₹33ee– Female is an award given by Indiantelevision.com as part of its annual Indian Telly Awards for TV serials, to recognize a female actor who has delivered an outstanding performance in a comic role.

The award was first awarded in 2002. Since 2012, the award has been separated in two categories, Jury Award and Popular Award. Jury award is given by the chosen jury of critics assigned to the function while Popular Award is given on the basis of public voting.

List of winners

2002-10

2002 Reema Lagoo - Tu Tu Main Main as Devki Verma aka Saasu Maa
Supriya Pilgaonkar - Tu Tu Main Main as Radha Verma
Asawari Joshi - Office Office as Usha
Seema Kapoor - Hum Saath Aath Hain as Vimmo
Shagufta Ali - Tedhe Medhe Sapne 

2003 Supriya Pathak - Khichdi as Hansa Parekh
Asawari Joshi - Office Office as Usha
Tanaaz Currim - Meri Biwi Wonderfool as Angela
Karishma Tanna - Kyunki Saas Bhi Kabhi Bahu Thi as Indu
Delnaaz Paul - Yes Boss as Kavita Verma
Sushmita Mukherjee - Ramkhilawan C.M. 'n' Family as Imarti Devi

2004 Manini Mishra - Jassi Jaissi Koi Nahin as Pari Kapadia
Asawari Joshi - Office Office as Usha
Supriya Pathak - Khichdi as Hansa Parekh
Vandana Pathak - Khichdi as Jayshree Parekh
Farida Jalal - Shararat  as  Sushma "Nani" Malhotra

2005 Supriya Pathak - Instant Khichdi as Hansa Parekh
Vandana Pathak - Instant Khichdi as Jayshree Parekh
Ratna Pathak Shah - Sarabhai vs Sarabhai as Maya Sarabhai
Rupali Ganguly - Sarabhai vs Sarabhai as Monisha Sarabhai
Sushmita Mukherjee - Kkavyanjali as Romila

2006 Suchita Trivedi - Baa Bahoo Aur Baby as Meenakshi Thakkar
Shweta Kawatra  - Sohni Mahiwal as Soni
Ratna Pathak Shah - Sarabhai vs Sarabhai as Maya Sarabhai
Divya Dutta - Shanno Ki Shaadi as Shanno
Rajeshwari Sachdev - Ji Behenji as Behenji

2007 Snehal Sahay - Banoo Main Teri Dulhann as Shalu
Farida Jalal - Shararat  as  Sushma "Nani" Malhotra
Shweta Kawatra  - Sohni Mahiwal as Soni
Ketki Dave - Kyunki Saas Bhi Kabhi Bahu Thi as Daksha Virani
Shagufta Ali - Woh Rehne Waali Mehlon Ki as Phufi
Kavita Kaushik - F.I.R as Chandramukhi Chautala
Suchita Trivedi - Baa Bahoo Aur Baby as Meenakshi Thakkar

2008 Suchita Trivedi - Baa Bahoo Aur Baby as Meenakshi Thakkar
Kavita Kaushik - F.I.R as Chandramukhi Chautala
Suchita Trivedi - Baa Bahoo Aur Baby as Meenakshi Thakkar
Supriya Pathak - Remote Control as Baari Maasi
Tasneem Sheikh - Kyunki Saas Bhi Kabhi Bahu Thi as Mohini Harsh Virani
Ashita Dhawan - Sapna Babul Ka...Bidaai as Malti Sharma
Disha Vakani - Taarak Mehta Ka Ooltah Chashmah as Daya Jethalal Gada

2009 Disha Vakani - Taarak Mehta Ka Ooltah Chashmah as Daya Jethalal Gada
Suchita Trivedi - Baa Bahoo Aur Baby as Meenakshi Thakkar
Kavita Kaushik - F.I.R as Chandramukhi Chautala
Juhi Babbar - Ghar Ki Baat Hai as Radhika Yagnik
Ashita Dhawan - Sapna Babul Ka...Bidaai as Malti Sharma

2010 Disha Vakani - Taarak Mehta Ka Ooltah Chashmah as Daya Jethalal Gada
Pushtiie Shakti - Mahi Way as Mahi Talwar
Ami Trivedi - Papad Pol  as Kokila Parikh
Kavita Kaushik - F.I.R as Chandramukhi Chautala
Usha Nadkarni - Pavitra Rishta as Savita Deshmukh
Apara Mehta - Sajan Re Jhoot Mat Bolo as Damini Devi Diwan

2012-present

Popular Awards 
2012 Kavita Kaushik - F.I.R as Chandramukhi Chautala
Disha Vakani - Taarak Mehta Ka Ooltah Chashmah as Daya Jethalal Gada
Vandana Pathak - R. K. Laxman Ki Duniya as Bakula Bhavesh Vasavda
Smita Singh - Hitler Didi as Sunaina Sharma
Sucheta Khanna - Lapataganj as Indumati Gupta

2013 Giaa Manek - Jeannie Aur Juju as Jeannie
Kanika Maheshwari - Diya Aur Baati Hum as Meenakshi Vikram Rathi
Utkarsha Naik - Iss Pyaar Ko Kya Naam Doon? as Manorama Singh Raizada
Disha Vakani - Taarak Mehta Ka Ooltah Chashmah as Daya Jethalal Gada
Sucheta Khanna - Lapataganj as Indumati Gupta

Jury Awards 

2012 Disha Vakani - Taarak Mehta Ka Ooltah Chashmah as Daya Jethalal Gada
Kavita Kaushik - F.I.R as Chandramukhi Chautala
Sucheta Khanna - Lapataganj as Indumati Gupta
Divyanka Tripathi - Chintu Chinki Aur Ek Badi Si Love Story as Mrs. Rashmi Sharma 		
Shubhangi Gokhale - Lapataganj as Mishri Mausi 	

2013 Disha Vakani - Taarak Mehta Ka Ooltah Chashmah as Daya Jethalal Gada
Kanika Maheshwari - Diya Aur Baati Hum as Meenakshi Vikram Rathi
Utkarsha Naik - Iss Pyaar Ko Kya Naam Doon? as Manorama Singh Raizada
Shubhangi Gokhale - Lapataganj as Mishri Mausi 	
Sucheta Khanna - Lapataganj as Indumati Gupta

References

Indian Telly Awards